Pratilipi is an Indian online self-publishing and audiobook portal. It features content in twelve languages: Hindi, Urdu, English, Gujarati, Bengali, Marathi, Malayalam, Tamil, Kannada, Telugu, Punjabi and Odia.

History 
Pratilipi is a Sanskrit word meaning "you become what you read". It allows users to publish and read original works such as stories, poetry, essays and articles. It also allows readers to rate content posted by others, subscribe to authors and interact with their followers through messaging.

It was launched in September 2014 by Ranjeet Pratap Singh, Prashant Gupta, Rahul Ranjan, Sahradayi Modi, and Sankaranarayanan Devarajan to promote Indian languages. In its initial stage, it was a self-funded platform. Later, the creators raised funding of ₹30 lakh from TLabs (Times Internet Accelerator) in March 2015 and raised another USD1 million from investors led by Nexus Venture Partners in 2016. 

At its launch, the platform featured content in only two languages: Hindi and Gujarati. It later expanded to six more languages; Bengali, Marathi, Kannada, Tamil, Telugu and Malayalam. It also raised USD4.3 million from Series A round led by Omidyar Network in February 2018, and in 2020 secured 76 crore in the funding round of Series C led by Tencent.

Award 
Pratilipi was awarded Eureka Award for Best Business Idea by IIT Bombay and StartUp Launchpad Award for best startup.

References

External links

Ebook sources
Online publishing companies
Self-publishing companies
Indian companies established in 2014
Publishing companies of India
Companies based in Bangalore
2014 establishments in Karnataka